Christine Jones Forman is a senior astrophysicist at the Center for Astrophysics  Harvard & Smithsonian. She is a past president of the American Astronomical Society, and was the director of the Smithsonian Institution's Consortium for Unlocking the Mysteries of the Universe.

Education and career
In high school Forman attended the Ross Mathematics Program, Arnold Ross' summer mathematics program for gifted high school students. She finished high school in West Carrollton, Ohio before moving to Cambridge, Massachusetts where she earned three astrophysics degrees from Harvard University: an AB in 1971, AM in 1972, and PhD in 1974. During her time as a student, Forman was both a post-doctoral fellow at the Center for Astrophysics and a Harvard Junior Fellow.

Forman has been an astrophysicist at the Smithsonian Astrophysical Observatory since 1973 and previously served as the head of the Chandra Calibration Group from 1990–2010. In 2010, Forman was named director of the Consortium for Unlocking the Mysteries of the Universe, and became one of four directors of the Smithsonian Institution’s Consortia for the Four Grand Challenges of the Strategic Plan.

Honors
In 1985, Forman and her husband William R. Forman were the first recipients of the Bruno Rossi Prize, an award given annually by the American Astronomical Society "for a significant contribution to High Energy Astrophysics, with particular emphasis on recent, original work." They received a $500 reward and a certificate "for pioneering work in the study of X-ray emission from early type galaxies."

In 2013, Forman became the 14th recipient of the Secretary's Distinguished Research Lecture Award of the Smithsonian Institution.

Personal life
Forman is married to astrophysicist Bill Forman. Together they have three children: Julia, Daniel, and Miranda.

References 

American astrophysicists
Women astrophysicists
21st-century American women scientists
Harvard College alumni
People from Montgomery County, Ohio
Living people
Year of birth missing (living people)
Harvard Graduate School of Arts and Sciences alumni